Corinne Jorry  (born 23 April 1943) is a French costume designer. She was nominated four times for the César Award for Costume Design, which she won for her work in the film All the World's Mornings (1991). She was also nominated for the Academy Award for Best Costume Design for her work in Madame Bovary (1991).

References

External links 

French costume designers
Women costume designers
1943 births
Living people